The Surmic languages are a branch of the Eastern Sudanic language family.

Today, the various peoples who speak Surmic languages make their living in a variety of ways, including nomadic herders, settled farmers, and slash and burn farmers. They live in a variety of terrain, from the lowlands of South Sudan and the banks of the Omo River to mountains over 2,300 meters.

Languages
The Surmic languages are:
North: Majang (also known as Majangir)
South
Southeast: 
Kwegu (dialects: Yidinich, Mugiji)
Me'en
Mursi–Suri (dialects: Tirma, Chai)
Southwest: Didinga–Laarim, Murle, Tennet; Kacipo-Balesi

The Surmic languages are found in southwest Ethiopia and adjoining parts of southeast South Sudan. In the past, Surmic had been known as “Didinga-Murle” and “Surma”. The former name was too narrow by referring only to two closely related languages and the latter was a label also used to refer to a specific language (Unseth 1997b), so the label “Surmic” is now used. The relationships in the chart above are based on Fleming's work (1983).

Previous studies
Much foundational fieldwork and analysis of Surmic languages was done by Harold C. Fleming and M. L. Bender. The most complete descriptions of Ethiopian Surmic languages are of Murle (Arensen 1982) and Tirma (Bryant 1999).  All Surmic languages are presumed to be tonal, have implosive consonants, and have distinctive vowel length.  Some have as many as nine vowel qualities, and more detailed study may confirm this in other Surmic languages, also.  Me'en and Kwegu (also spelled Koegu) have sets of ejective consonants.

The languages share a system of marking the number of both the possessed and the possessor in possessive pronouns (Unseth 1991).  Number of nominals is typically marked on a number of morphemes, with t/k marking singular and plural (Bryan 1959).  Adjectives are formed by stative relative clauses.

Majangir (also called Majang) and Southwest Surmic languages (Fleming 1983) share a number of traits, so they are therefore presumably reconstructable in Proto-Surmic: relative clauses (which include adjectives), demonstratives, adverbs, numerals, genitives, and possessive pronouns follow their heads, noun derivations and subject marking on verbs are marked by suffixes, VSO (verb–subject–object) order predominates in indicative main clauses. Some typologically exceptional points are discussed by Arensen, et al. (1997). However, Dimmendaal’s introduction proposes a different analysis (1998).

All Surmic languages have been documented as having case suffixes (Unseth 1989). None of them have a marked accusative, but at least Majang and Murle sometimes mark nominatives, part of a broader areal pattern (König 2006).

The original geographic home of the Surmic peoples is thought to be in Southwestern Ethiopia, somewhere near Maji, with the various groups dispersing from there: for example, the Majangir having moved north, the Murle having migrated clockwise around Lake Turkana (Arensen 1983:56-61, Tornay 1981), and the Mursi having moved into and out of the Omo River valley. Ethnolinguistic identities within the Surmic group have not been rigid, with ample evidence of people’s identities shifting from one ethnolinguistic group to another (Tornay 1981, Turton 1979, Unseth and Abbink 1998).

Abbink has published a pioneering work comparing the vocabulary and systems of kinship among Surmic languages, particularly from the South West node of Surmic (Abbink 2006).

The starting point for linguistic and anthropological research into Surmic studies is the book edited by Dimmendaal (1998), especially the bibliography article (Abbink and Unseth 1998).

Reconstruction
The sound systems of Proto-Southwest Surmic and Proto-Southeast Surmic have been reconstructed by Yigezu (2001). Unseth has proposed a reconstruction of the case suffixes for Proto-Surmic. Unseth has reconstructed the system of marking possession for Proto-Surmic. Unseth has also reconstructed a causative prefix for Proto-Surmic.

Numerals
Comparison of numerals in individual languages: One of the shared innovations that separates Southeast Surmic languages from the rest of Surmic is that they have a base 10 system, rather than building to 10 from 5, such as five-plus-one, etc.

See also
List of Proto-Surmic reconstructions (Wiktionary)

References

Relevant literature
 Abbink, Jon. 2006. Kinship and society among Surmic-speakling people in Southwest Ethiopia: A brief comparison. Proceedings of the XVth International Conference of Ethiopian Studies, edited by Siegbert Uhlig, pp. 9–14. Wiesbaden: Otto Harrassowitz Verlag.
 Abbink, Jon and Peter Unseth. 1998. "Surmic Languages and Cultures: A Bibliography."  Surmic Languages and Cultures, ed. by Gerrit Dimmendaal, pp. 127–142. Cologne: Köppe.
 Arensen, Jonathan. 1983. Sticks and straw: Comparative house forms in southern Sudan.  Dallas: International Museum of Cultures.
 Arensen, Jon, Nicky de Jong, Scott Randal, Peter Unseth.  1997. "Interrogatives in Surmic Languages and Greenberg's Universals," Occasional Papers in the Study of Sudanese Languages 7:71–90.
Bender, M. Lionel.  "The Surma language group: a preliminary report". Studies in African Linguistics, Supplement 7, pp. 11–21.
 Bryan, Margaret. 1959.  The T/K Languages: A New Substratum. Africa 29:1–21.
 Bryant, Michael. 1999. "Aspects of Tirmaga grammar." MA thesis, University of Texas at Arlington.
 Dimmendaal, Gerrit. 1998. "A syntactic typology of the Surmic family from an areal and historical-comparative point of view," in Surmic Languages and Cultures, ed. by Gerrit Dimmendaal, pp. 35–82. Cologne: Köppe
 Fleming, Harold. 1983. "Surmic etymologies," in Nilotic Studies: Proceedings of the International Symposium on Languages and History of the Nilotic Peoples, Rainer Vossen and Marianne Bechhaus-Gerst, 524–555. Berlin: Dietrich Reimer.
 König, Christa. 2006. "Marked nominative in Africa,"  Studies in Language 30.4: 655–732.
 Moges Yigezu, "A comparative study of the phonetics and phonology of Surmic languages". Ph.D dissertation. Université Libre de Bruxelles, 2002
 Tornay, Serge. 1981. "The Omo Murle Enigma," in Peoples and cultures of the Ethio-Sudan Borderland, M.L. Bender (ed.), pp. 33–60.  (Northeast African Studies, Monograph 10).  East Lansing: Michigan State University.
 Turton, David. 1979. "A Journey Made Them: Territorial Segmentation and Ethnic Identity Among the Mursi," in Segmentary Lineage Systems Reconsidered, Ladislav Holý (ed.), 19–143. (Queen's University Papers in Social Anthropology, vol. 4). Belfast.
 Unseth, Peter. 1987. "A Typological Anomaly in Some Surma Languages," Studies in African Linguistics 18.357–361.
 Unseth, Peter. 1988. "The Validity and Unity of the Southeast Surma Language Grouping," Northeast African Studies 10.2/3:151–163.
 Unseth, Peter. 1997b. "Disentangling the Two Languages Called 'Suri'," Occasional Papers in the Study of Sudanese Languages 7:49–69.  
 Unseth, Peter and Jon Abbink. 1998. "Cross-ethnic Clan Identities Among Surmic Groups," in Surmic Languages and Cultures, Gerrit Deimmendaal (ed.), pp. 103–112.  Cologne: Koppe.

 
Language families
Languages of Ethiopia
Languages of South Sudan
Southern Eastern Sudanic languages